The 187th Massachusetts General Court, consisting of the Massachusetts Senate and the Massachusetts House of Representatives, met in 2011 and 2012 during the governorship of Deval Patrick. Therese Murray served as president of the Senate and Robert DeLeo served as speaker of the House.

Discussion topics included the Rose Fitzgerald Kennedy Greenway.

Senators

Representatives

See also
 112th United States Congress
 List of Massachusetts General Courts

References

External links

 
  (2011, 2012)
  (includes some video)

Political history of Massachusetts
Massachusetts legislative sessions
massachusetts
2011 in Massachusetts
massachusetts
2012 in Massachusetts